Gibbs v. Buck, 307 U.S. 66 (1939), was a United States Supreme Court case in which the Court had two main holdings. First, an association of copyright holders, ASCAP, may sum their collective costs to meet the damages threshold for federal jurisdiction. Second, a motion to dismiss allegations that raise "grave doubts about the constitutionality" of legislation should be denied.

References

External links
 

1939 in United States case law
United States copyright case law
United States Supreme Court cases
United States Supreme Court cases of the Hughes Court